Christien is a unisex given name. Notable people with the name include:

Christien Anholt (born 1971), English stage, television and film actor
Christien Tinsley (born 1974), make-up artist

See also
Christian (disambiguation)
Christine (disambiguation)

Masculine given names